Clément Duhour was born in Saint-Jean d’Anglet, in the Aquitaine region of south-western France on 11 December 1912. He died on 3 January 1983 in Neuilly-sur-Seine. He was a French athlete, singer, actor, film director and producer.

Biography 

A French Basque, Clément Duhour was the son of a baker. He was also the younger brother of Édouard Duhour. At age 16, he won his first French national championships in both the shot put and discus. Almost simultaneously, he was expelled from the public high school in Bayonne for "indiscipline". Subsequently, his father sent him to Paris to become an apprentice salesman at the Félix Potin grocery store. Three days later, he quit the apprenticeship to become an entertainer at the Lapin Agile club under the stage name Guy Lormont. In 1932, he took part in the Summer Olympic Games in Los Angeles shot put competition, where he tossed well beyond the 45-foot mark without much training. His brother, Édouard, was also a French shot putter, who competed in the event at the Olympics the previous year. The following year, Clément was again crowned French national shot put champion.

During the German occupation of France, Duhour opens his own cabaret, Le Cavalier, on the Rue de Ponthieu, in the 8th arrondissement of Paris. He also starts his movie career as "Boris Ivanovitch" in L'Âge d'or directed by Jean de Limur. According to Hans von Luck, Duhour's cafe-inn was a cover for Resistance activities, thus hiding resisters behind a cloak of superficial compliance with the Germans. In 1942, Duhour met Viviane Romance and they married in 1943. Together they created the production company Izarra Films, "izarra" meaning "star" in Basque.

After the end of the Second World War, Clément Duhour becomes Sacha Guitry's regular producer and collaborator through his production company "CLM" (Courts et Longs Métrages), whose name is meant as a quasi-acronym of his first name, Clément ("Clem"). This association would prove fruitful in the 1950s with the production of a series of cinematographic masterpieces, like the cult classics Three Make a Pair, Lovers And Thieves or If Paris Were Told To Us.

Clément Duhour also paid tribute to Sacha Guitry's memory after his death in 1957 by directing and producing Life Together (La Vie à deux) in 1958.

He died "of natural causes" on January 3, 1983, in Neuilly. He was 71 years old.

Filmography

As actor

As director

Only as producer

References

1912 births
1983 deaths
Athletes (track and field) at the 1932 Summer Olympics
French male film actors
French male discus throwers
French male shot putters
French film directors
Sportspeople from Pyrénées-Atlantiques
20th-century French male actors
Place of birth missing
20th-century French male singers
Olympic athletes of France